This is a list of viceroys in the British Windward Islands.  The colony of the Windward Islands was created in 1833 and consisted of Grenada, Barbados (to 1885), Saint Vincent and the Grenadines, Tobago (to 1889), St. Lucia (from 1838), and Dominica (from 1940). The Governor of Barbados was also the Governor of the Windward Islands, until Barbados became an independent colony in 1885. After this, a Governor of the Windward Islands was appointed with a seat in Grenada.

Governors of Barbados and the British Windward Islands (1833–1885)

Governors-in-Chief of the Windward Islands (1885–1960)

References

 Rulers.org – Barbados
 Rulers.org – Grenada
 WorldStatesmen- Grenada

External links

Windwards
 
Windward Islands
Windward Islands
Windward Islands
Windward Islands
Windward Islands
Windward Islands